Colin Macmillan Turnbull (November 23, 1924 – July 28, 1994) was a British-American anthropologist who came to public attention with the popular books The Forest People (on the Mbuti Pygmies of Zaire) and The Mountain People (on the Ik people of Uganda), and  one of the first anthropologists to work in the field of ethnomusicology.

Early life
Turnbull was born in London and educated at Westminster School and Magdalen College, Oxford, where he studied politics and philosophy. During World War II he was in the Royal Naval Volunteer Reserve after which he was awarded a two-year grant in the Department of Indian Religion and Philosophy, Banaras Hindu University, India, from which he graduated with a master's degree in Indian Religion and Philosophy.

Career
In 1951, after his graduation from Banaras, Turnbull traveled to the Belgian Congo (present-day Democratic Republic of the Congo) with Newton Beal, a schoolteacher from Ohio he met in India. Turnbull and Beal first studied the Mbuti pygmies during this time, though that was not the goal of the trip.

An "odd job" Turnbull picked up while in Africa at this time was working for the Hollywood producer Sam Spiegel. Spiegel hired Turnbull to assist in the construction and transportation of a boat needed for his film. This boat was the African Queen, which was used for the feature film The African Queen (starring Humphrey Bogart and Katharine Hepburn; 1951). After his first trip to Africa, Turnbull traveled to Yellowknife in the Northwest Territories, where he worked as a geologist and gold miner for a year, before he went back to school to obtain another degree.

Upon returning to Oxford in 1954,  Turnbull began specializing in the anthropology of Africa. He remained in Oxford for two years before another field trip to Africa, finally focusing on the Belgian Congo (1957–58) and Uganda. After years of fieldwork, he finally achieved his anthropology doctorate from Oxford in 1964.

Turnbull became a naturalized citizen of the United States in 1965, after he moved to New York City to become curator in charge of African Ethnology at the American Museum of Natural History in 1959. He later resided in Lancaster County, and was on staff in the Department of Sociology and Anthropology, Virginia Commonwealth University, in Richmond, Virginia. Other professional associations included corresponding membership of Royal Museum for Central Africa and a fellowship in the British Royal Anthropological Institute. He first gained prominence with his book The Forest People (1961), a study of the Mbuti people.

In 1972, having been commissioned to come up with an explanation and solution to the difficulties experienced by the Ik people, the controversial The Mountain People was published.  The Ik were a hunter-gatherer tribe who had been forced to stop moving around ancestral lands, through the seasons, because it now involved the three national borders of Uganda, Kenya and Sudan. Forced to become stationary in Uganda, and without a knowledge base and culture for survival under such conditions, they failed to thrive, even to the point of starvation and death.

The Mountain People was later adapted into a theatrical work by playwright Peter Brook.

Contributions to music
Some of Turnbull's recordings of Mbuti music were commercially released, and his works inspired other ethnomusicological studies, such as those of Simha Arom and Mauro Campagnoli.  His  recording of Music of the Rainforest Pygmies, recorded in 1961, was released on CD by Lyrichord Discs, Inc. His recording of a Zaire pygmy girls' initiation song was used on the Voyager Golden Record.

Personal life
Turnbull's partner, Joseph Allen Towles, was born in Senora, Virginia, on August 17, 1937. In 1957 he moved to New York City to pursue a career as an actor and writer. He met Turnbull in 1959 and they exchanged marriage vows the following year.

From 1965 to 1967, Turnbull and Towles conducted fieldwork among the Ik of Northern Uganda in Africa. In the Congo in 1970, they conducted fieldwork on the Nkumbi circumcision initiation ritual for boys and the Asa myth of origin among the Mbo of the Ituri forest.

In 1979, they traveled studying the concept of tourism as pilgrimage. Towles criticised Turnbull's semi-autobiographical work The Human Cycle (1983), which omitted all references to their relationship.

Turnbull arranged for Towles' research to be published posthumously. It appeared in 1993 as Nkumbi initiation ritual and structure among the Mbo of Zaïre and as Asa: Myth of Origin of the Blood Brotherhood Among the Mbo of the Ituri Forest, both in Annales of the Royal Museum for Central Africa (Tervuren, Belgium), vol. 137.

Later years
Late in life Turnbull took up the political cause of death row inmates. After his partner's death, Turnbull donated all his belongings to the United Negro College Fund. He donated all their research materials, most of which were the product of his career, to the College of Charleston, insisting that the collection be known under Towles' name alone.

In 1989, Turnbull moved to Bloomington, Indiana, to participate in the building of Tibetan Cultural Center with his friend Thupten Jigme Norbu, elder brother of the 14th Dalai Lama. Later Turnbull moved to Dharamsala, India where he took the monks' vow of Tibetan Buddhism, given to him by the Dalai Lama. Turnbull's partner, Joseph A Towles died of AIDS in 1988, and Turnbull had Towles book "Nkumbi Initiation and Asa: Myth of Origin of the Blood Brotherhood Among the Mbo of the Ituri Forest" published posthumously. Turnbull himself died of AIDS in 1994.

Controversy
Bernd Heine exemplifies the strong reaction evoked by Turnbull's evaluation of the Ik in a 1985 article. Using information gained 20 years after Turnbull's researches, he provided new information that appeared to discredit the portrayal of the Ik provided by Turnbull.
Many people found Turnbull's accounts of the Ik disturbing; however, his graphic descriptions were placed into context by interviews he did with older Ik to contrast the older society that existed prior to displacement. BBC Radio 4 broadcast 10 March 2021 a review by Matthew Syed of the influence of Turnbull's Mountain People and its subsequent reassessment and revision by anthropologists.

Publications
 1961 The Forest People. 
 1962 The Lonely African. 
 1962 The Peoples of Africa.
 1965 Wayward Servants: The Two Worlds of the African Pygmies. 
 1966 Tradition and Change in African Tribal Life.
 1968 Tibet: Its History, Religion and People. (with Thubten Jigme Norbu). 
 1972 The Mountain People. 
 1973 Africa and Change editor. 
 1976 Man in Africa. 
 1978 "Rethinking the Ik: A functional Non-Social System". In: Charles D. Laughlin, Jr.; Ivan A. Brady (ed.): Extinction and Survival in Human Populations. New York: Columbia University Press
 1983 The Human Cycle. 
 1983 The Mbuti Pygmies: Change and Adaptation. 
 1992  Music of the Rain Forest Pygmies: The Historic Recordings Made By Colin M. Turnbull Label: Lyrichord Discs Inc.
"The Mbuti Pygmies: An Ethnographic Survey" in Anthropological Papers of the American Museum of Natural History, 50: 139–282

See also
 Simha Arom, who also studied pygmy culture

References

Sources

 Grinker, Roy R. In the Arms of Africa: The Life of Colin M. Turnbull, Chicago: University of Chicago Press, 2001. 
 Smithsonian Institution: Review of In the Arms of Africa, AnthroNotes, Vol. 22, No. 1, Fall 2000.

External links
 Inventory of the Joseph A. Towles Papers, c. 1920s – 2009, in the Avery Research Center at the College of Charleston
 Official website of Grinker's biography
 Podcast BBC Radio 4 "Sideways" 28 minute "Matthew Syed examines the work of the controversial anthropologist Colin Turnbull who claimed to have discovered 'the most selfish people on earth'."

1924 births
1994 deaths
English people of Scottish descent
AIDS-related deaths in Virginia
American Buddhist monks
English anthropologists
Banaras Hindu University alumni
American ethnomusicologists
British emigrants to the United States
American gay writers
Writers from London
People educated at Westminster School, London
Alumni of Magdalen College, Oxford
Royal Naval Volunteer Reserve personnel of World War II
People from Lancaster County, Virginia
English Buddhist monks
LGBT Buddhists
LGBT monks
American LGBT scientists
English LGBT writers
Scientists from London
Writers from Virginia
LGBT military personnel
British LGBT scientists
LGBT people from Virginia
20th-century American musicologists
20th-century American anthropologists
20th-century Buddhist monks
Gay scientists
Converts to Buddhism